P22 may refer to:
 P22 (type foundry), a digital type foundry, Rochester, New York, United States
 , a patrol vessel of the Irish Naval Service
 Curtiss XP-22 Hawk, an experimental biplane fighter
 , of the Armed Forces of Malta
 Mwera language
 Papyrus 22, a biblical manuscript
 Salmonella virus P22, a bacteriophage
 Walther P22, a pistol
 Norfolk Southern train P22, involved in the 2005 Graniteville train crash, South Carolina, United States
 P22, a state regional road in Latvia
 P-22, a mountain lion that resided in Griffith Park, Los Angeles, California, United States